Roman Catholic churches(igreja) or chapels (capela) is a common feature of the landscape in the municipality of Póvoa de Varzim in Portugal.  The list also include a sanctuary (santuário) and a basilica (basílica), but does not include sideway shrines, such as the city's alminhas and other similar religious constructions.

Póvoa de Varzim is divided into 14 parishes and is part of the Archdeacon of Vila do Conde and Póvoa de Varzim, located in the Archdiocese of Braga.

List of Parish churches and other churches and chapels
The list only includes religious temples from the Roman Catholic Church, it does not include temples from other faiths.

 
Povoa de Varzim
Churches in Povoa de Varzim